Illuminato may refer to:

Illuminato da Rieti (fl. 1219), companion of Saint Francis
Illuminato da Chieti (f. c. 1281), bishop of Assisi
Filippo Illuminato (1930–1943), Italian partisan during World War II

See also
Illuminatus (disambiguation)